The Mall at Westlake, almost always referred to as Westlake Mall is a vacant and closed community mall in Bessemer, Alabama.

History
Westlake Mall was built on a former lake bed, along US Highway 11. The mall opened in 1969 with three anchors, Sears, Grant's, and Loveman's.

In 1970, former Governor George Wallace held a campaign event for re-election at the mall that was estimated to be attended by 10,000 people, one of the biggest turnouts during his last gubernatorial race.

In the late 1970s and 1980s, the mall saw decline. In November 1983, an 18 year old female was raped after being kidnapped near the mall by masked abductors. All three original anchors closed by 1989, making it a dead mall or deserted mall. Continuing urban sprawl southwestward toward the Tuscaloosa County line and increased crime and poverty in the city of Bessemer all contributed to the mall's demise.

During the mid 1980s, there was an effort to turn the mall into a  factory outlet center, though many regular stores were still open.

In 1994, Bruno's Supermarkets opened a flagship store in the former Sears anchor location. It was the company's largest store. The mall continued to operate with a small assortment of stores, including a Goody's Family Clothing store in the former Loveman's anchor location.

The Goody's store relocated elsewhere in the late 2000s, and Bruno's filed bankruptcy in 2009, closing its store at the mall.

The center was sold to Bessemer used-car dealership owner Anthony Underwood, who wants to revive the center once again as an outlet mall. , the mall sits vacant and sealed, with several of its entrances blocked.

References

External links
http://skycity2.blogspot.com/2010/03/west-lake-mall-bessemer-al.html

1969 establishments in Alabama
2009 disestablishments in Alabama
Bessemer, Alabama
Buildings and structures in Jefferson County, Alabama
Defunct shopping malls in the United States
Shopping malls in Alabama
Shopping malls established in 1969
Shopping malls disestablished in 2009